August 2012

Known Erroneous Reports
This section includes deaths which were initially reported as police killings but later turned out not to be.

See also

References

 08
August 2012 events in the United States